Captain America is a Timely/Atlas/Marvel comic book superhero.

Characters
 Captain America (Ultimate Marvel character), a parallel universe counterpart of Captain America
 In the Marvel Cinematic Universe:
 Steve Rogers (Marvel Cinematic Universe), the first person to use the "Captain America" name
 John Walker (Marvel Cinematic Universe), the second person to use the "Captain America" name
 Sam Wilson (Marvel Cinematic Universe), the third person to use the "Captain America" name

Comics
 Captain America (comic book), a Marvel comics series
 Captain America (serial), a 1944 serial, based on the comic

Films
 Captain America (1979 film), a film starring Reb Brown
 Captain America (1990 film), a film starring Matt Salinger
 Captain America: The First Avenger, a 2011 film starring Chris Evans
 Captain America: The Winter Soldier, a 2014 film and sequel to The First Avenger
 Captain America: Civil War, a 2016 film and sequel to The Winter Soldier
 Captain America: New World Order, a 2024 film and sequel to Civil WarPeople nicknamed Captain America
 John Carlson (ice hockey), National Hockey League defenseman for the Washington Capitals
 Randy Couture, mixed martial arts fighter
 Claudio Reyna, former captain of the United States men's national soccer team
 Spencer Stone, U.S. Air Force staff sergeant
 David Wright, player for Major League Baseball team the New York Mets
 Christian Pulisic, professional soccer player for Chelsea F.C. and current captain of the United States men's national team
 Joe Pavelski, professional hockey player currently playing for the NHL's Dallas Stars
 Ryan Hunter-Reay, professional motorsports driver, 2012 IndyCar Champion and 2014 Indy 500 winner.

Other
 Captain America (Jimmy Buffett album), a 2002 album by Jimmy Buffett
 Captain America (motorcycle), a chopper motorcycle in Easy RiderSee also
 Captain America in other media
 Captain America in: The Doom Tube of Dr. Megalomann, 1987
 Captain America and The Avengers'', 1991